52e Rue Est was a jazz record label in France during the 1970s and the 1980s that released a few jazz, soul, and blues albums. The label's roster included Chet Baker and Archie Shepp.

Discography

Notes:
 006 & 025 unconfirmed
 018 is an expanded version of the LP Vent du Sud 105 (titled You're My Thrill)
 023 is a reissue of Planet PLL-1001

References

Jazz record labels